In physics and mathematics, an ansatz (meaning: "initial placement of a tool at a work piece", plural Ansätze) is an educated guess or an additional assumption made to help solve a problem, and which may later be verified to be part of the solution by its results.

Use
An ansatz is the establishment of the starting equation(s), the theorem(s), or the value(s) describing a mathematical or physical problem or solution. It typically provides an initial estimate or framework to the solution of a mathematical problem, and can also take into consideration the boundary conditions (in fact, an ansatz is sometimes thought of as a "trial answer" and an important technique in solving differential equations). 

After an ansatz, which constitutes nothing more than an assumption, has been established, the equations are solved more precisely for the general function of interest, which then constitutes a confirmation of the assumption. In essence, an ansatz makes assumptions about the form of the solution to a problem so as to make the solution easier to find.

It has been demonstrated that machine learning techniques can be applied to provide initial estimates similar to those invented by humans and to discover new ones in case no ansatz is available.

Examples
Given a set of experimental data that looks to be clustered about a line, a linear ansatz could be made to find the parameters of the line by a least squares curve fit. Variational approximation methods use ansätze and then fit the parameters.

Another example could be the mass, energy, and entropy balance equations that, considered simultaneous for purposes of the elementary operations of linear algebra, are the ansatz to most basic problems of thermodynamics.

Another example of an ansatz is to suppose the solution of a homogeneous linear differential equation to take an exponential form, or a power form in the case of a difference equation. More generally, one can guess a particular solution of a system of equations, and test such an ansatz by directly substituting the solution into the system of equations. In many cases, the assumed form of the solution is general enough that it can represent arbitrary functions, in such a way that the set of solutions found this way is a full set of all the solutions.

See also

 Method of undetermined coefficients
 Bayesian inference
 Bethe ansatz
 Coupled cluster, a technique for solving the many-body problem that is based on an exponential Ansatz
 Demarcation problem
 Guesstimate
 Heuristic
 Hypothesis
 Trial and error
 Train of thought

References

Bibliography 

Philosophy of physics
Concepts in physics
Mathematical terminology
German_words_and_phrases